Ratti is an Italian surname. Notable people with the surname include:

 Achille Ratti (1857–1939), Pope Pius XI
 Carlo Ratti (born 1971), Italian architect, engineer and inventor
 Carlo Giuseppe Ratti (1737–1795), Italian art biographer and painter
 Eddy Ratti (born 1977), Italian former cyclist
 Eugenia Ratti (born 1933), Italian soprano
 Filippo Walter Ratti (1914–1981), Italian screenwriter and film director
 Francesco Ratti (1819-?), Italian engraver
 Giovanni Agostino Ratti (1699–1755), Italian painter
 Lorenzo Ratti (ca. 1589–1630), Italian baroque composer
 Héber Ignacio Ratti (born 1994), Uruguayan footballer
 James Ratti (born 1991), Welsh rugby union player 
 Julia Ratti (born 1969), Democratic member of the Nevada Senate
 Lorenzo Ratti (1589-1630), Italian baroque composer
 Nico Ratti (born 1993), Argentine footballer
 Ratti Petit (1906-1988), Indian painter, photographer, writer and composer
 Steven H. Ratti (born 1956), former United States Coast Guard officer
 Michael Ratti (born 1980), Rat Pot, mentor and idol of the RaKrug

Italian-language surnames